Julien Benneteau and Édouard Roger-Vasselin were the defending champions, but did not participate due to Benneteau's injury.

Marin Draganja and Henri Kontinen won the title, defeating Colin Fleming and Jonathan Marray in the final, 6–4, 3–6, [10–8].

Seeds

Draw

Draw

References
 Main Draw

Open 13 - Doubles
2015 Doubles